Putintsev is a Russian masculine surname, its feminine counterpart is Putintseva. It may refer to
Fedor Putintsev (1899–1947), Soviet propagandist of atheism 
Yulia Putintseva (born 1995), Kazakhstani tennis player of Russian origin

Russian-language surnames